Kause is a village in Lääneranna Parish, Pärnu County, in western Estonia.

References

 

Villages in Pärnu County